Måns (alternatively Maans) is a Swedish given name that may refer to
Måns,  fictional cat in the Pelle Svanslös children's stories of Gösta Knutsson
8536 Måns, a minor planet named after the cat
Måns Andersson, 17th century Swedish explorer
Måns Ekvall (born 1995), Swedish football player 
Måns Forsfjäll (born 2002), Swedish ice hockey defenceman 
Måns Gahrton (born 1961), Swedish author
Måns Grenhagen (born 1993), Swedish racing driver
Måns Groundstroem (born 1949), Finnish bass player, studio technician and music producer
Måns Hedberg (born 1993), Swedish snowboarder
Måns Herngren (born 1965), Swedish actor and film director
Måns Mårlind (born 1969), Swedish film director and screenwriter
Måns Nathanaelson (born 1976), Swedish actor
Måns Nilsson Kling, 17th century Swedish explorer
Måns Olström (born 1996), Swedish footballer 
Måns von Rosenstein (1755–1801), Swedish Navy rear admiral
Måns Olström (born 1996), Swedish football defender 
Måns Saebbö (born 2000), Swedish footballer
Måns Söderqvist (born 1993), Swedish football forward 
Måns Sörensson (born 1986), Swedish footballer 
Måns Zelmerlöw (born 1986), Swedish pop singer and television presenter

See also
Mans (surname)
Magnus

Swedish masculine given names